Willis Burton "Bill" Banker (April 4, 1907 – September 25, 1985) was an American college football player and one-time vice president of Pinnacle Oil Co. His younger brother Buddy Banker was also an athlete.

Tulane University
Banker was a prominent halfback for the Tulane Green Wave football team of Tulane University from 1927 to 1929, in the last leading Tulane to an undefeated season. He was known as the "Blond Blizzard" due to his blond hair and playing without a helmet.

During the 1929 game with Georgia Tech, Banker wore a helmet onto the field because coach Bernie Bierman threatened to yank him out of the game. But the helmet slipped over his eyes as the Yellow Jackets were preparing to kickoff, so Banker tossed it to the sideline, and was never taken out, calling Bierman's bluff. He was featured as part of the All-American football team in the 1930 Warner Bros. feature movie Maybe It's Love starring 20-year-old Joan Bennett and comedian Joe E. Brown.

Banker once held Tulane's school records for career scoring (263 points), career touchdowns (37), career rushing yards (2,516), touchdowns in a single game (4), most rushes in a career (515), most rushes in a game (43) and average yards rushing in a game (93.2). Banker was a charter member of the Tulane Athletics Hall of Fame. He was elected to the College Football Hall of Fame in 1977, and the Louisiana Sports Hall of Fame in 1978.

Death
Banker died of a heart attack on September 25, 1985.

References

External links
 

1907 births
1985 deaths
American football halfbacks
Tulane Green Wave football players
College Football Hall of Fame inductees
Sportspeople from Lake Charles, Louisiana
Players of American football from Louisiana
All-American college football players
All-Southern college football players
American football placekickers
American football drop kickers